Mount Simeon District, also known as Jabal Sem`an, is a district of Aleppo Governorate in northern Syria. The administrative centre is the city of Aleppo.
   
Until December 2008, the sub-district of Atāreb was part of Mount Simeon District before being incorporated as a separate district. At the 2004 census, the remaining sub-districts had a total population of 2,413,878.

Sub-districts
The district of Mount Simeon is divided into seven sub-districts or nawāḥī (population as of 2004):

 Zammar Subdistrict was separated from al-Zirbah Subdistrict in 2009.

See also
Mount Simeon

References

 
Districts of Aleppo Governorate